Wolfe Island is an island at the entrance to the Saint Lawrence River in Lake Ontario near Kingston, Ontario. Wolfe Island is part of Frontenac County, Ontario and the Township of Frontenac Islands. It is the largest of the Thousand Islands. The largest community on the island is Marysville.

The resident population is about 1400 people, but this can double or triple in summer.

It is the site of the Wolfe Island Wind Project, a 197.8 MW wind farm consisting of 86 wind turbines, in operation since 2009.

History 
The island was part of the traditional hunting lands of the Tyendinaga Mohawk people and the original name of the island is Kawehnóhkwes tsi kawè:note ("Long Island Standing"). The name is often given as "Ganounkouesnot", but this name makes no sense in the Tyendinaga Mohawk language. In 2021, the Township of Frontenac Islands voted officially to accept the name of Kawehnóhkwes tsi kawè:note and added it to the signs welcoming visitors to Wolfe Island. It was called Grand Island (Grande île) by the French. In a proclamation by the Lieutenant Governor of Upper Canada John Graves Simcoe on 16 July 1792, the island was renamed from Grand island to Wolfe island, after British General James Wolfe.

A scheme to ship goods from Cape Vincent, New York to Kingston in the mid 19th century by connecting Canadian and American railway systems required a canal to be dug across the island. Since there was no direct railway link across the channels to the north and south of the island, boats were needed to ship the goods. A system of steamships towing barges carrying railway cars across the channels and through the canal was planned. Construction started in 1852. Although completed, the canal did not serve its intended purpose and stopped being used by 1892.

It has been the site of various cheese factories, including one once operated by Kraft Foods.

Infrastructure 
Wolfe Island has its own post office (K0H 2Y0) and telephone exchange (+1-613-385-).

Wolfe Island can be reached by ferry from both Canada and the United States. The ferry from Kingston (Wolfe Islander III) is operated by the Ministry of Transportation and is free of charge. This ferry operates from two locations: the Summer Dock located in Marysville and the Winter Dock located at Dawson Point. This route includes an underwater air bubbler system that stretches to the Barrack Street Dock in Kingston, Ontario, whose purpose is to prevent ice buildup along the ferry's route in winter. This ferry service is currently being examined in an ongoing transportation study.  The seasonal Horne's Ferry (May to October) toll ferry to Cape Vincent, New York, first licensed in 1802, is still operated by the descendants of the first licence-holder and is one of the rare Canada-US international border crossings to be privately operated (the others are the Windsor-Detroit's Ambassador Bridge and Sombra–Marine City (Bluewater) Ferry).

A third ferry runs seasonally to join Wolfe Island to Simcoe Island.

Wolfe Island is the site of most Kingston radio transmitters; CKWS TV and radio, CKLC, CIKR and CFRC transmit from the island.

Flora and fauna
Snowy owls are frequently seen on the island during winter. It is also an important stopover location for migrating waterfowl including swans in spring and fall. Wolfe Island is also home to a growing population of wild turkeys, and well as deer and other fauna. It is designated an Important Bird Area.

The Big Sandy Bay Management Area on Wolfe Island is a 404-hectare property, classified as a provincially significant life sciences Area of Natural and Scientific Interest. Sand dunes and wetlands allow rare plant species to flourish here. Rare trees and birds deemed to be significant either regionally or provincially are also found here. The environmental area is protected and no motorized vehicles are allowed, though there is ample free parking provided at the entrance. A well-marked and level walking trail leads to a large, secluded sand beach with shallows reaching out well into Lake Ontario. The beach is safe and family-friendly, but there are no services, so visitors are encouraged to bring their own refreshments and must carry out all garbage and recyclables to dispose of at home.

Recreation and other facilities

There is one golf course on Wolfe Island, a corn maze and three marked bicycle routes and country roads. The town of Marysville includes a bakery, restaurants and various other shops and services, as well as the largest church in the Thousand Islands (Sacred Heart of Mary Church). A new medical clinic opened in the spring of 2010. There is a volunteer fire and ambulance service on the island.
Additionally, Wolfe Island has Big Sandy Bay Management Area. During the summer months in Marysville the Old House Museum is in operation. There are two elementary schools on the island: Marysville Public School that is part of the Limestone District School Board  and Sacred Heart Catholic School that is part of the Algonquin and Lakeshore Catholic District School Board.

In Marysville, the Township operates a tourist information centre seasonally.

The limestone Wolfe Island Town Hall is a National Historic Site of Canada.

Notable residents
 Fr. Raymond de Souza
 Kristina Walker, rower

See also
 Ontario Highway 95 and 96
 List of wind farms in Canada
Populated islands of the Great Lakes
List of townships in Ontario

References

Further reading

External links
 Wolfe Island
 Kingston to Marysville year-round ferry schedule
 Seasonal ferry to USA schedule

Landforms of Frontenac County
Islands of the Thousand Islands in Ontario
Islands of Lake Ontario in Ontario
Important Bird Areas of Ontario
Canada–United States border crossings